Aaron Michael Johnson (born June 9, 1991) is an American jazz saxophonist and bandleader.

Early life
Aaron Johnson began expressing interest in music at a young age. While he could play music fluently by the age of 13, he still could not read notation. His earliest woodwinds instructor Matt Utal recounted, "He was precocious, very bright and advanced for his age. I stressed the importance of learning to read, and he bogged down for a long time and became a great reader." Johnson was educated at Manhattan School of Music.

Career
At 18 Johnson was chosen as lead alto saxophonist in the Gibson/Baldwin Grammy Jazz Ensemble, with whom he performed and attended 51st Annual Grammy week.

In 2014, in New York, he produced an historically accurate recreation of the Charlie Parker with Strings albums, thenceforth becoming a fixture on New York's bebop scene, initially with his ensemble Aaron Johnson's Reboppers, and eventually with the Aaron Johnson Quartet.

Awards and honors
In 2009, at 17, Johnson became the youngest musician ever to be awarded the Outstanding Soloist title at the Monterey Next Generation Jazz Festival.

References

External links
 
 Johnson, A. M., "Initiation, Adepthood, Contact: Charlie Parker as Mystic, Higher Intelligence and Interdimensional Entity", Whitehot Magazine of Contemporary Art, September 2020
 SmallsLIVE Foundation, Aaron Johnson, 2012–present

1991 births
American jazz alto saxophonists
American male jazz musicians
Manhattan School of Music alumni
21st-century American saxophonists
Jazz musicians from Oregon
21st-century American male musicians
American male jazz composers
American jazz composers
People from Coos Bay, Oregon
Living people